Braxton Beacham (September 12, 1864 - September 24, 1924) was the eighteenth Mayor of Orlando from 1906 to 1907. He was also an Orlando businessman and entrepreneur who owned the Beacham Movie Theatre and founded "Prosper Colony" which became Taft, Florida. He married Roberta Holland on June 16, 1887. He died at the age of 60 in 1924 and was buried in Greenwood Cemetery.

References

Mayors of Orlando, Florida
1864 births
1924 deaths